The Riepe Drug Store/G. Ott Block  was located in downtown Davenport, Iowa, United States. It was listed on the National Register of Historic Places in 1983.

History
Local brewer W. H. Decker probably built this building as an investment commercial venture in 1871. Peter Schlichting operated a saloon here in the late 1870s, but it was not successful and he lost the property in a Sheriff's sale. Adelbert Riepe opened a drugstore in 1882, and he remained in business for a number of years. Other commercial ventures occupied the main floor commercial space over the years. Along with the former Mueller Lumber Company building on the 500 block of Second Street, this structure was torn down and is now the location of Community Health Care's downtown complex today. It was delisted from the National Register in 2014.

Architecture
The building was a three-story, brick structure in the Romanesque Revival style. It featured ornamental rows of brick, or corbelling, just below the cornice line.  Round-arch windows lined the second and third floors and were capped with a keystone.  The storefront had been altered in later years.

References

External links

Commercial buildings completed in 1871
Romanesque Revival architecture in Iowa
Former buildings and structures in Davenport, Iowa
Former National Register of Historic Places in Iowa
Commercial buildings on the National Register of Historic Places in Iowa
National Register of Historic Places in Davenport, Iowa
Demolished buildings and structures in Iowa